Miss Universe 2003 was the 52nd Miss Universe pageant, held at the Figali Convention Center in Panama City, Panama on June 3, 2003.

At the end of the event, Amelia Vega of the Dominican Republic was crowned by Justine Pasek of Panama as Miss Universe 2003. This is the first time that the Dominican Republic has been crowned Miss Universe. 

Contestants from 71 contestants competed in this year's pageant. The competition was hosted by Billy Bush and Daisy Fuentes. Musical quartet Bond and Puerto Rican singer-composer Chayanne performed in this year's pageant. This was also the first edition of Miss Universe to be aired on NBC.

Background

Selection of participants 
Contestants from 71 countries and territories were selected to compete in the pageant. Five delegates were appointees to their position to replace the original dethroned winner.

The winner of Miss Czech Republic 2002, Kateřina Průšová was replaced by Kateřina Smržová due to her poor English skills. Miss Egypt 2003, Horreya Farghally decided to give up the crown following several rumors of secret marriage, affecting her reputation's credibility receiving criticism by the press. Farghally was replaced by Nour El-Semary. The winner of Eesti Miss Estonia 2003, Maili Nomm was replaced by Katrin Susi due to being underage. The winner of Miss Poland 2002, Marta Matyjasik decided not to participate in Miss Universe 2003 due to academic reasons. Matyjasik was replaced by Iwona Makuch. 

Initially, the winner of Miss Russia 2002, Svetlana Koroleva was supposed to participate in Miss Universe 2003, but she went to Miss Europe 2002 in Lebanon and won the crown, making her unable to participate at Miss Universe. Then, the Miss Russia organizers held a small pageant called Miss Russia Universe 2003 which was won by Yulia Ahonkova. However, she was also unable to compete in the Miss Universe pageant due to her being underage. After that, the Miss Russia Organizers chose Maria Smirnova, a 22-year-old model from Nizhny Novgorod, to participate in Miss Universe 2003, but the MUO officials rejected her due to her nude pictures for Playboy Russia. With a few days to go before the end of entries, the Miss Universe Organization announced that it would accept the entry of Oksana Bondarenko, runner-up of Miss Russia 2002.

The 2003 edition saw the debut of Serbia and Montenegro, and the returns of Argentina, Barbados, Belize, New Zealand, and Chinese Taipei. Barbados last competed in 1999,  Belize in 2000, while the others last competed in 2001. The British Virgin Islands, Chile, Ghana, Honduras, Kenya, the Northern Mariana Islands, Portugal, the US Virgin Islands, and Uruguay withdrew. Bethsaida Smith of the British Virgin Islands and Kimberly Castro of the Northern Mariana Islands withdrew due to lack of sponsorship. Chile, Ghana, Honduras, Kenya, Portugal, the US Virgin Islands, and Uruguay withdrew after their respective organizations failed to hold a national competition or appoint a delegate.

Miss Iceland 2002, Manuela Ósk Harðardóttir withdrew from the pageant, when dehydration caused by the weather prevented her from competing in the Preliminaries. She stayed in Panama until the pageant was over, joined by her boyfriend. Donna Tuara of the Cook Islands and Joyce Ramarofahatra of Madagascar did not participate due to lack of sponsorship. Tiziana Mifsud of Malta did not compete after the Miss Malta pageant lost their Miss Universe licence. Mounia Achlaf of Algeria and Melanie Putria Dewita Sari of Indonesia withdrew due to undisclosed reasons.

Results

Placements

Special awards

Contestants 
71 contestants competed for the title.

Notes

References

External links 
 Miss Universe official website

2003
2003 in Panama
2003 beauty pageants
Beauty pageants in Panama
Events in Panama City
June 2003 events in North America